The Mangahauini River is a river of the Gisborne Region of New Zealand's North Island. It flows generally south from its origins southwest of Te Puia Springs, reaching the Pacific Ocean close to the settlement of Tokomaru Bay.

Major floods occurred in 1916, 1924, 1950, 1963 and the 2022 flood washed away part of the State Highway 35 bridge at Tokomaru Bay, which was last rebuilt in 1966. The new bridge is downstream from its predecessor. The main road runs through the valley for several kilometres, crossing the river three times.

See also
List of rivers of New Zealand

References

Rivers of the Gisborne District
Rivers of New Zealand